Gera or Géra can refer to:

Places

Africa
 Gera (Egypt) (also Geras or Gerrha), former city and current Latin Catholic titular see
 Kingdom of Gera, a former realm in present-day Ethiopia
 Gera (woreda), district located in Ethiopia about the same place as the former kingdom

Europe
 Gera, a city in Thuringia, Germany
 Bezirk Gera former district of the German Democratic Republic centered on Gera
 Gera, former community on the Zahme Gera river, today Geraberg, Germany
 Gera (river), a river in Thuringia, Germany, and its sources and tributaries
 Wilde Gera, left tributary
 Wilde Gera (Erfurt), arm of the Gera at Erfurt, Germany
 Zahme Gera, right tributary 
 Gera, Greece, municipality on the island of Lesbos, Greece
 Gera (Pizzighettone) a locality in Lombardy, Italy
 Gera Lario, a town in Lombardy, Italy
 Sveta Gera, peak of the Žumberak hills in Croatia, named after St. Gertrude the Great

People 
 Gera, name of several minor characters in the Bible
Elida Gera, Israeli female film director, dancer and choreographer

Other uses
 GoldenEye: Rogue Agent, a James Bond spin-off video game
 The Global Entertainment Retail Association, a trade association for entertainment retailers in Europe

See also
 Gera (surname)
 Ghera (disambiguation)
 Gerra (disambiguation)
 Geras (disambiguation)
 Gerah, an ancient Hebrew unit of weight and currency